Raymond John Fee (January 12, 1903 – June 2, 1983) was an American boxer who competed in the 1924 Summer Olympics. He was born in Saint Paul, Minnesota and died in Collier County, Florida. In 1924 he won the bronze medal in the flyweight category.

1924 Olympic results
Below are the results of Raymond Fee, a flyweight boxer who competed for the United States at the 1924 Paris Olympics:

 Round of 32: bye
 Round of 16: defeated Vicente Catada (Argentina) on points
 Quarterfinal: defeated Oscar Bergstrom (Sweden) on points
 Semifinal: lost to James McKenzie (Great Britain) on points
 Bronze Medal Bout: defeated Rinaldo Castellenghi (Italy) by walkover

References

External links
 
 Social Security Death Index
 

1903 births
1983 deaths
Boxers from Saint Paul, Minnesota
Flyweight boxers
Boxers at the 1924 Summer Olympics
Olympic bronze medalists for the United States in boxing
American male boxers
Medalists at the 1924 Summer Olympics